This is a list of results in events produced by Philippine Wrestling Revolution (PWR), an independent professional wrestling promotion in the Philippines.

PWR was founded in 2013 by a group of Filipinos who want to start their own wrestling company. Its first official show, Renaissance, took place in September 2014. Many of PWR's events have been staged in Makati venues, but it has since been held in Manila, Mandaluyong, Parañaque, Pasig, and Quezon City.

It has also booked house shows in Quezon province, in Batanes, and the Asia Pop Comic Convention in 2016 and 2017.

Renaissance (2014)

Renaissance was PWR's inaugural event, held at the Makati Square Arena in Makati on September 27, 2014.

Terminus (2014)

This card was aired by TV5 in March 2015.

Vendetta (2015)

The first Vendetta event featured two matches that determined the competitors for the inaugural PWR Championship at Wrevolution X.

Wrevolution X (2015)

Wrevolution X is PWR's annual flagship event happening every May. The inaugural PWR Champion was crowned during this event.

PWR Live

PWR Live events take place between major PWR events. This first edition featured the start of a tournament for the inaugural Philippine Hybrid X (PHX) Championship, which will be crowned at next month's Renaissance.

Videos of the matches from this event were posted by Rappler the following day.

During the pre-show, Kanto Terror hosted a drinking contest, with 2 people from the audience as his challengers; he lost.

Renaissance (2015)

The PHX Championship tournament culminated during this event. This would be the last PWR show held at the Makati Square Arena.

Before the main event, comedian Stanley Chi hosted a Suplado Show in-ring segment, with Kanto Terror, then Mark D. Manalo and PWR General Manager Mr. Sy.

PWR Live 2

This is the first PWR show at the iAcademy Auditorium.

The show started with Rederick Mahaba hosting a Mahabang Usapan in-ring segment, with The Royal Flush as guests.

Terminus (2015)

The Path of Gold trophy was first awarded at this event. Its holder earns the right to challenge either the PWR champion or the PHX champion at any time within the next 12 months. It would later become a regular fixture in Terminus events.

During the pre-show, comedian Stanley Chi hosted a Suplado Show in-ring segment, with Mr. Sy and The Network as guests.

Path of Gold match - Order of entry and elimination

PWR Live: Road to Vendetta

Vendetta (2016)

The event featured the first-ever intergender match in PWR history, with Peter Versoza taking on Crystal.

PWR Live: Manila Madness

This was PWR's first event in the city of Manila.

PWR Live: The Road to Wrevolution X

This was PWR's first event in Parañaque.

Wrevolution X (2016)

"The Senyorito" Jake de Leon cashed in his Path of Gold Trophy for a shot at the PWR Championship at this event.

PHX Gauntlet Match - Order of entry and elimination
 Yohann Ollores defeated Vintendo
 Mark D. Manalo defeated Yohann Ollores
 Joey Bax defeated Mark D. Manalo
 SANDATA defeated Joey Bax via submission
 SANDATA defeated Trabajador Uno
 Chino Guinto defeated SANDATA
 Chino Guinto defeated Crystal

PWR Live: The ShawDown

This was PWR's first event in Mandaluyong.

During the show, Rederick Mahaba hosted a Mahabang Usapan in-ring segment, with PWR Champion Jake de Leon, Ralph Imabayashi, John Sebastian, PHX Champion Main Maxx, and Peter Versoza as guests.

Crystal and Scarlett were scheduled to have a contract signing for a match at Renaissance, but Scarlett announced her retirement from wrestling days before PWR Live.

Renaissance (2016)

This was PWR's first event in Pasig.

PWR Live: Suplex Sunday

During the event, The Network leader James "Idol" Martinez delivered a "State of the Network Address".

PWR Live: Bagong Yugto

This was PWR's first show in Quezon City.

PWR was supposed to hold its annual Terminus show in December 2016, but had to cancel it because of "directional developments" within the company.

Path of Gold (2017)

Making his first appearance for PWR, former NWA Canadian Junior Heavyweight Champion Billy Suede competed at the pre-show.

Path of Gold match - Order of entry and elimination

PWR Live: Mainit

A tournament to crown the inaugural PWR Tag Team Champions kicked off at this event. The winners in each of the 3 qualifying matches will face off at Wrevolution X.

Wrevolution X (2017)

The inaugural PWR Tag Team Champions were crowned at this event.

Chris Panzer also cashed in his Path of Gold Trophy for a shot at the PWR Championship.

PWR Live: Resbak

International wrestler Koto Hiro from Japan made his first appearance for PWR at this event.

Renaissance (2017)

Rederick Mahaba hosted a Mahabang Usapan in-ring segment, with Ralph Imabayashi as guest. Mr. Sy, Evan Carleaux and Main Maxx served as the commentary team.

PWR Live: Bakbakan sa Bayanihan

Chino Guinto relinquished the PHX Championship at this event due to a knee injury, which would take him out of in-ring action for 8 to 10 months.

Also, after The Apocalypse's victory in the All Out War Match, the PWR Board awarded him with the PWR All Out War Championship in recognition of his success in All Out War matches.

PWR Live: Sugod!

This was PWR's first show at the Power Mac Center Spotlight in Makati.

In the opening segment, John Sebastian revealed that he became a co-owner of PWR after buying 50% of the company. He then challenged Mr. Sy to a 5-on-5 elimination match at Vendetta. If Mr. Sy's team loses, he would be fired as PWR General Manager.

PWR Live: Oktoberplex

The event featured a "rap battle" between Vintendo and McKata at the pre-show.

Vendetta (2017)

"Ubusan ng Lahi" match - Order of elimination
 Joey Bax is eliminated by Jake de Leon via submission
 Peter Versoza, by SANDATA
 SANDATA, by Rederick Mahaba
 Rederick Mahaba, by Chris Panzer
 Chris Panzer, by Ralph Imabayashi
 Dax Xaviera, by John Sebastian
 John Sebastian, by Miguel Rosales
 Jake de Leon, by Miguel Rosales
 Miguel Rosales, by Ralph Imabayashi
Last man standing: Ralph Imabayashi

PWR Live: Kingdom Come

The show started with a Mahabang Usapan segment featuring Team Sebastian.

It also featured the start of a four-team tournament to determine who will be the next challengers to the PWR Tag Team Championship. Meanwhile, PHX Champion Mike Madrigal issued an open challenge for his title.

PWR Live: Holding Hands While Wrestling

The show started with a "Championship Celebration of Love and Respect" by Rederick Mahaba for the new PWR Champion, Ralph Imabayashi. It was interrupted by Miguel Rosales.

Before the match between The Network and the team of McKata and Brad Cruz, John Sebastian officiated a rap battle between James "Idol" Martinez and McKata, which Martinez won.

At the end of the tournament to determine the #1 contenders to the PWR Tag Team Championship, John Sebastian and Crystal inserted themselves into the title match at Path of Gold, making it a triple threat match.

Path of Gold (2018)

After the first match on the main card, Rederick Mahaba took to the mic in an in-ring segment to announce that he would enter #2 at the Path of Gold match.

Path of Gold match - Order of entry and elimination

PWR Live: Trapik

Wrevolution X (2018) 

Ken Warren cashed in his Path of Gold Trophy for a shot at the PHX Championship.

Robin Sane of Manila Wrestling Federation also competed in this event.

PWR Live: Re5peto 

At this show, a No. 1 contender's tournament began to determine the next challenger to the PWR Championship.

PWR Live: Way of the Champion 

During the show, Evan Carleaux hosted the Carleaux Sheaux segment, with guests PWR Tag Team Champions John Sebastian and Crystal.

Also, international wrestler Koto Hiro fought Ralph Imabayashi with the PWR Championship on the line at the main event.

Renaissance (2018)

PWR Live: Homefront 

International wrestlers The Ladykiller (from Singapore) and Tengu (from the United Kingdom), as well as Robin Sane from Manila Wrestling Federation competed in this event.

PWR Live: Shake, Rassle & Roll 

A scheduled match between Bolt and Dax Xaviera did not officially take place, because Xaviera attacked Bolt before the bell rang.

Malaysian wrestler Emman the Kid also competed at this event.

Vendetta (2018) 

International wrestlers Dr. Gore and "The Statement" Andruew Tang (from Singapore) and Aysha (from Australia) competed at this event.

PWR Live: New Year's Wrestle-ution 

International wrestler "El Guapo" Carlos Zamora competed at the pre-show.

PWR Live: Nice!

Path of Gold (2019) 

Multiple international wrestlers competed at this event: "Dynomite Soul" Eric Walker (from USA) and Masa Takanashi, DJ Nira, and Emi Sakura (all from Japan).

Path of Gold match - Order of entry and elimination

PWR Live: Destino

Event posters

References

Wrestling
Professional wrestling shows
Professional wrestling-related lists